Me and My Monsters is a children's comedy television program from The Jim Henson Company that combines live action and puppetry. The series is a co-production filmed in Australia. It first screened on CBBC on 18 October 2010 and airs on Network Ten and Nickelodeon.

Overview
The Carlson family, who have recently relocated from Australia to the UK, discover that there are three monsters living in their basement. Eddie would get along with the monsters much to the chagrin of his father and sister and to the delight of his mother.

Production
The series is produced by Tiger Aspect Productions and Sticky Pictures with the Jim Henson Company. It was commissioned by the BBC in the UK for CBBC, ZDF in Germany, and Network Ten and Nickelodeon Australia in Australia. It features four human actors and three monster puppets developed by Jim Henson's Creature Shop. The series is primarily written by Mark Grant, Larry Rickard, George Sawyer, Tom Basden, Sam Leifer, and James Bachman with occasional guest writers. There were 13 episodes in the first series. A second series aired less than half a year later and features 13 more episodes. The first series aired on CBBC on 18 October 2010 and aired every week day except Monday until Series 1 Episode 10, Dust Bag Love, which aired on 29 October. Episodes 1 through 10 had a slot of 8:00 am or 8:05 am during half term. When half term finished, the show did not air until 3 November 2010 with Episodes 11 and 12, airing at 6:30pm. Episode 13 aired after that weekend on its normal Tuesday not Monday slot concluding Series One on 8 November 2010. A second series was then set to start airing on 11 April 2011 at 8:00 am, and a new repeat slot of 6:15 pm for the new episodes has been made on CBBC. Originally, the whole two seasons was made as 26 episodes of half-hour for one whole series but has split into two seasons with a 4 to 5-month gap in between their original airdates.

Characters
 Eddie Carlson (played by Macauley Keeper) – The monsters' best friend, who is at school at Whitgift in Surrey.
 Angela Carlson (played by Ivy Latimer) – Eddie's older sister who doesn't like the monsters.
 Kate Carlson (played by Lauren Clair) – Eddie's mother; a self-employed cook who the monsters call "human-mum-thingy-person".
 Nick Carlson (played by Felix Williamson) – Eddie's father; a businessman working in advertising who the monsters call "human-dad-thingy-person".

Monsters
 Haggis (performed by Don Austen, assisted by Sean Masterson (Episodes 1-6) and David Collins (Episodes 7-26), voiced by David C Collins) - A gigantic red and orange monster. He doesn't do a good job at being a monster since he tends to scare himself.
 Norman (performed by Matthew McCoy (Episodes 1-6) and Sean Masterson (Episodes 7-26), assisted by Fiona Gentle, voiced by David C Collins) - A purple monster who is a bit of an oddball and is the only one who can't talk; instead making bizarre noises though Fiend and Haggis can still understand him.
 Fiend (performed by Heath McIvor and Alice Osborne, voiced by David C Collins) - A green multi-eyed monster who is the smallest of the bunch. He considers himself the leader of the monsters.

Cast 
 Macauley Keeper - Eddie Carlson
Ivy Latimer - Angela Carlson
 Lauren Clair - Kate Carlson
Felix Williamson - Nick Carlson

Puppeteers
Don Austen - Haggis
 David Collins - Norman, Haggis (assistant puppeteer)
 Fiona Gentle - Norman (assistant puppeteer)
 Sean Masterson - Haggis (assistant puppeteer)
 Matthew McCoy - Norman (assistant puppeteer)
Heath McIvor - Fiend
 Alice Osborne - Fiend (assistant puppeteer)

Books 
Four episodes from the series were turned into books. The first one was called monsters in the basement and was based on series 1, episode 1. The second book was called Monster mess and was based on series 1, episode 10. The third book was called Monster mess and was based on series 1, episode 12. The fourth and final book was called Monster school and was based on series 1, episode 2. Although all books are based on episodes from series 1, the third and fourth book were released during series 2.  All books are written by Rory Growler.

Episodes

Series 1 (2010)

Series 2 (2011)

NOTE: Only Series 2 Episodes 1-7 were broadcast in HD on BBC HD in Spring 2011 and Series 1 Episodes 1–4 on CBBC HD throughout December 2013, although all the episodes were filmed in HD. Series 1 episodes 5-13 were aired from 27 February until 11 March 2015. They were aired on CBBC HD.

Home media
The full series of Me and My Monsters was released as a box set in Germany and Switzerland. Also in Norway and Sweden. In Australia, there has been a DVD release of Me and My Monsters called Series 1: Episodes 1–7. As the title says it contains the first seven episodes only.

International broadcasts

References

External links
 
 Me and My Monsters at Muppet Wiki

2010 American television series debuts
2010 Australian television series debuts
2010 British television series debuts
American children's fantasy television series
Australian children's fantasy television series
British children's fantasy television series
Network 10 original programming
English-language television shows
American television shows featuring puppetry
Australian television shows featuring puppetry
British television shows featuring puppetry
Television series about monsters
Television series by The Jim Henson Company
Television series by Tiger Aspect Productions